"Faded" is a song by Canadian pop group soulDecision. It was released in Canada in 1999 as the lead single from their debut album, No One Does It Better. The song reached number-one in Canada and peaked at number 22 on the Billboard Hot 100 when released in the United States in 2000. The song was nominated for song of the year at 2001 Juno Awards.

Versions
The song has three versions: one with the beginning lyrics "When I get you all alone, I'm gonna take off all your clothes"; an edited version with "When I get you all alone, I'm gonna move in nice and close"; and a third version featuring a verse by rapper Thrust.

Music video
The video was shot in Vancouver in an apartment building having various rooms. One room was a house party, another of the band performing in an all white room, and another of the band singing together. The video was released in 1999 in Canada and then internationally in 2000. The video reached the number four spot on MTV's TRL and number five on MuchMusic Countdown.

Track listing
US single 
 "Faded" (radio version) – 3:28
 "Faded" (22 Green club mix radio edit) – 3:29

Canada maxi-CD 
 "Faded" (radio version) – 3:28 rap (featuring) – Thrust
 "Faded" (album version) – 3:29
 "Faded" (22 Green club mix radio edit) – 3:29

Canada vinyl, 12", promo 
A1 "Faded" (album version) – 3:29
A2 "Faded" (Morning Sun Dubly) – 7:15
B1 "Faded" (22 Green club mix) – 9:05
B2 "Faded" (22 Green club mix radio edit) – 3:29

"22 Green" and "Morning Sun Dubly" remixes were reproduced and mixed by Mark Ryan.

Chart performance
The single proved successful in the United States as well, peaking at number 22 on the Billboard Hot 100. The single was the biggest hit internationally for soulDecision's and the biggest hit of the band's lifespan. It peaked at number 23 in Australia on 21 January 2001.

Charts

References

SoulDecision songs
RPM Top Singles number-one singles
2000 debut singles
1998 songs
MGM Records singles
Songs written by Trevor Guthrie